Santa Ana del Valle is a town and municipality in Oaxaca in south-western Mexico. The municipality covers an area of  km². 
It is part of the Tlacolula District in the east of the Valles Centrales Region.

As of 2005, the municipality had a total population of 1996.

The town's church is notable for its large number of fine colonial-era santos (statues of saints), many executed in polychrome and well preserved to this day.

References

Municipalities of Oaxaca